School classification is the categorization of secondary schools by officially sanctioned bodies for athletic competition. Across North America, the classes have often been based on enrollment levels of the schools, with many leagues using classifications named A, AA, AAA, etc.

Classes 
Classification of secondary schools is performed by officially sanctioned bodies to attempt to provide an equitable grouping of potential talent for athletic competition. Across North America, the classes have often been based on enrollment levels of the schools, with many leagues using classifications named A, AA, AAA, etc., with the number of As denoting schools with larger enrollment, but alternative schemes are also employed. Schools may be placed in different classes for different sports (e.g., A for football and AA for baseball).

References

See also 
 National Federation of State High School Associations#Member associations
 Ontario Federation of School Athletic Associations
 PIAA class

High school sports